Jessica Anne Newham (born 5 October 1991), known by her stage name Betty Who, is an Australian-American musician, singer and songwriter. After independently releasing her debut single, "Somebody Loves You" (2012), and her debut extended play, The Movement (2013), she signed with RCA Records and later released her debut studio album, Take Me When You Go (2014). Her second studio album, The Valley (2017), saw the commercial success of her cover of "I Love You Always Forever", which peaked inside the top ten in Australia and reached the top of the Billboard Dance Club Songs chart in the United States.

Early life
Jessica Anne Newham was born in Sydney, Australia, where she lived until her mid-teens. Trained since the age of four as a cellist, she moved to the United States in 2007 to attend Interlochen Center for the Arts in Michigan.

Newham is also self-taught on piano and guitar, wrote her first songs at age 14, and began performing as a singer-songwriter two years later. Her stage name comes from the title of a song she composed at age 16 about unrequited love.

After school at Ascham in Sydney and Frensham in the Southern Highlands, NSW, Newham attended Berklee College of Music in Boston. During her first semester, she met producer Peter Thomas who was also attending Berklee. Thomas suggested pairing Newham's songwriting with a more dreamy, anthemic production style. The two began writing new material together and developed Newham's sound over the next two years.

Career

2010–2013: Career beginnings, "Somebody Loves You" and The Movement

As Betty Who, Newham's debut single "Somebody Loves You" was initially released independently as a free download, and was premiered by pop music blogger and at-the-time official Grammy blogger Arjan Writes on 30 November 2012. Co-written by Newham and Thomas, and produced by Thomas, the song garnered immediate praise, spreading quickly online and being featured by other well-known outlets including Socialite Life, Pop on And On, and Popservations. A music video, directed by Evan Savitt, was released on 22 January 2013, and an official remix by acclaimed indie pop producer FM Attack was released on 11 March 2013.

Newham's debut EP, The Movement, was released on 17 April 2013. An independent, free-download release initially, the EP's huge success online helped lead to a large amount of major label interest, before she ultimately signed with RCA Records. It premiered on Billboard on 9 April 2013, one week prior to its official release date.

On 11 September 2013, Spencer Stout uploaded a YouTube video of him proposing to his boyfriend Dustin in a flash mob dance routine at a Salt Lake City, Utah Home Depot. The video, which featured "Somebody Loves You" became a viral hit online. The attention of the video coupled with the track's official iTunes release, led to the song debuting at number 44 on the overall iTunes Charts, as well as debuting as the number 4 most viral song on Spotify.

Who signed to RCA Records on 15 September 2013.

2014–2017: Take Me When You Go and The Valley

On 8 March 2014, "Somebody Loves You" reached number one on Billboard's Dance/Club Play Songs chart.

In April 2014, Who released her second EP, Slow Dancing, which made it to number one on the iTunes pop music charts. The first single from that EP, titled "Heartbreak Dream", was released on iTunes and Google Play on 18 February 2014. The song is used over the end credits of the 2015 film Pitch Perfect 2.

Who has praised Katy Perry, Robyn and Miley Cyrus as influences. She told Variance Magazine in 2014 that they "make pop that's generational. They're making the pop music of our generation that's going to stick around. People are going to look back and be like, 'Oh my God, it's Robyn's Body Talk album. That's one of the best pop albums of the last 10 years.'" Who supported Katy Perry and Kylie Minogue on part of the Australia leg of The Prismatic World Tour and Kiss Me Once Tour respectively. In 2014, Who made her American television debut when she performed "Somebody Loves You" on Watch What Happens: Live.

In late August 2014, Who made the announcement that her full-length debut album, Take Me When You Go, would be released on 7 October 2014. She also released the track list with the announcement. Thirteen songs, four of them being taken from her previous EPs, appeared on the album.  From the album, the track "All of You" was her second number one on the US Dance chart, peaking at number one on 21 February 2015.

On 3 June 2016, Who released a cover of Donna Lewis' "I Love You Always Forever". It became her third number one on the Billboard Dance Club Songs chart, and proved to be her breakthrough hit in Australia, reaching number 6 on the ARIA Singles Chart.

On 24 March 2017, Who's second album, The Valley was released.

2018–2020: Betty

On 19 January 2018, Who released "Ignore Me", which is Who's first single as an independent artist, after parting in 2017 with RCA Records. On 16 February 2018, the singer released a cover of Kylie Minogue's "Come Into My World" for Made in Australia compilation by Amazon Music. In 2018, Who released a remixed version of Widelife's "All Things (Just Keep Getting Better)" to be used as the theme song for season two of the Netflix reboot Queer Eye. A music video was released featuring the cast of Queer Eye and Who.

On 15 June 2018, Betty, Pt. 1, Who's third EP, was released containing the singles "Ignore Me", "Look Back" and "Taste" as well as two other previously unreleased songs: "Just Thought You Should Know" and "Friend Like Me".

On 14 November 2018, "Between You & Me" was released as another new single. It was the first single from the new album Betty that had not been previously released on the Betty, Pt 1 EP. With the release of this single, Betty Who used different shades of blue and photos of herself on her social media profiles to release lyrics to the song. The lyrics that were revealed were "You've got one hand on the wheel", "Sitting at the red light, tensions are high, vibe you could cut with a knife", and "just between you  & me, I can feel something here, wondering if you do too". An Instagram post by Betty Who on the day after the release showed that the single already had 22,310 streams on Spotify, and had risen to 31,000 streams two hours later. By 12 December 2018, streams had surpassed 500,000. The music video for this song dropped on 28 November 2018, in which Betty Who plays herself as well as her own love interest. On 10 January 2019, "I Remember" was released as the fifth single from the album, with the music video for the song being released on 24 January.

In June 2020, she launched a Patreon to fund new music and give fans access to exclusive content. That September, Who made her acting debut in the comedy-drama film Unpregnant portraying Kira Matthews, a character she described as "a totally badass, confident and queer race car driver".

2022-present: The One That Got Away and Big!
In May 2022, it was revealed that Who would be making her reality TV debut by hosting the new dating show The One That Got Away. Produced by Amazon Studios and Fulwell 73 and executive produced by Elan Gale, the series is set to premiere on June 24, 2022. The show is a time-traveling, experimental dating series where six people searching for their soulmates are given the chance to explore a lifetime of missed connections as, one by one, people from their pasts enter through "The Portal" to surprise them and take their shot at love.

On 3 June 2022, Who released her first single in over two years titled "Blow Out My Candle". The music video, directed by Tyler Cunningham, made its broadcast premiere on MTV and finds Who embracing the '80s aesthetic as she dances around in a Jamie Lee Curtis-inspired workout leotard, sweatband, and high socks as she sings about self confidence and love. Speaking of the delay in her return due to the Covid-19 pandemic, Who stated: "It's been a long couple years for all of us. 'Blow Out My Candle' is the story I want to share most. The feeling I held onto in the darkest moments of the last couple years." The song is the lead single to her upcoming fourth studio album, set for release in late 2022.

Television
Who hosted the series, The One That Got Away, and with Kesha, hunts ghosts in Conjuring Kesha.

Artistry 
Who is an alto, with a vocal delivery that has been described as "breathy". As a multi-instrumentalist, Who has played cello, piano and guitar since childhood, having taught herself the latter two. Several critics have noted Who's songs, particularly her early work, are heavily indebted to 1980s music, with the singer herself admitting she has a strong bias towards "big-sounding 1980s synth-pop", a sound she claims she and songwriting-producing partner Peter Thomas spent nearly two-and-a-half years cultivating. AllMusic biographer Heather Phares said the singer "makes big-hearted pop music" while "Borrowing sounds and styles from the '80s onward and putting her own joyous stamp on them". The artist has described her approach to songwriting as "taking influences from [past] music and mixing it in with the emotions I’m actually living through". Who has also cited 1990s pop acts such as Britney Spears and the Backstreet Boys as musical influences, with Spears serving as one of several eclectic sources of inspiration for her third album, Betty. PopMatters' Evan Sawdey summarized her work as "a streamlined, full-pastel celebration of her favorite dance-pop idols".

Who is primarily a pop, dance-pop and synth-pop singer, which starkly contrasts with her classical music upbringing and training. CBS News described her debut album Take Me When You Go as a combination of "dance hits, love songs and ballads – all with a hint of synthesizer, drums and keyboard", whereas Betty was her most musically diverse body of work upon release. Josh Rogosin of NPR, who served as audio engineer for Who's Tiny Desk Concert in 2019, observed that "When all the studio production is stripped away, what's left are intricate melodies that soar through Betty's impressive vocal range and relatable lyrics", admitting he was impressed by her "raw vocal performance". According to Sam Lansky of Idolator, she frequently combines heartbreaking lyrics with infectious melodies, spunk and "massive" hooks, while AXS said she "paint[s] pictures with a hypnotic and heartfelt honesty". Who's musical style and artistry have drawn comparisons to female artists such as Cyndi Lauper, Robyn, Pink, Katy Perry, Madonna, and Whitney Houston, with Houston's death in 2012 inspiring her to write her debut single "Somebody Loves You". Who has also cited prolific singer-songwriters Joni Mitchell and Carole King as songwriting influences, as well as singer-songwriters Missy Higgins and Ingrid Michaelson. Who recalled that, early in her career, she was accused of being unoriginal for resembling Pink too closely, largely due to their similar hairstyles, and believes female artists are subjected to an expectation to be original that male artists do not experience.

Who's output has been generally acclaimed by music critics and the press. In 2013, Lansky hailed her as "the next great pop star", before she had released a full-length album. Following her successful debut, in 2014 Edward Helmore of The Guardian hailed Who as "the latest bright young thing to provide a lesson in how to construct a career with few of the conventional components", describing her as "a singer whose talent and following has come naturally, rather than under the direction of a pop Svengali or management team that oversees every tweet or Instagram picture". Meanwhile, music consultant Andy Gershon labeled her "an accidental pop star" due to her perceived authenticity and way in which she initially established a strong following and fanbase with little involvement from a record company. Comparing her public profile and potential to that of dance-pop contemporary Carly Rae Jepsen, Sawdey observed that Who continues to fall short of mainstream success despite positive reviews and constantly selling out smaller venues, describing her as "a guilty pop secret that only a select few knew about".

Who cites actress Marilyn Monroe as one of her main fashion inspirations, crediting her size with helping her appreciate her own body time.

Personal life
Who describes herself as a "queer, bisexual woman". In 2014, Who began dating photographer Zak Cassar, son of director and producer Jon Cassar. The couple announced their engagement on 21 November 2017. They were married in 2020. Who is a dual citizen of Australia and the United States.

Discography

Studio albums

Extended plays

Singles

As lead artist

As featured artist

Album appearances

Remixes

Music videos

Notes

Awards

See also
 List of number-one dance hits (United States)
 List of artists who reached number one on the US Dance chart

References

1991 births
21st-century Australian singers
Australian dance musicians
Australian emigrants to the United States
Australian women pop singers
American dance musicians
American women pop singers
Berklee College of Music alumni
People educated at Frensham School
Australian women singer-songwriters
Australian women in electronic music
American women singer-songwriters
American women in electronic music
Dance-pop musicians
Living people
Singers from Sydney
21st-century Australian women singers
Patreon creators
Bisexual women
Bisexual musicians
Australian LGBT singers
American singer-songwriters
21st-century LGBT people
21st-century American women
Australian contraltos
American contraltos